Head Games is the third studio album by the British-American rock band Foreigner, released on 10 September 1979 by Atlantic Records. Recorded at Atlantic Studios in New York, with additional recording and whole mixing taking place at Cherokee Studios in Los Angeles, it was the only Foreigner album co-produced by Roy Thomas Baker, best known for working on Queen's classic albums. It marked the first appearance of new bass guitarist Rick Wills (formerly of Jokers Wild and Small Faces) who replaced Ed Gagliardi (who was fired from the band), and was the last album with founding members Ian McDonald and Al Greenwood, who would leave the band after the recording. Head Games is also the last Foreigner album to feature a lead vocal by guitarist Mick Jones ("The Modern Day").

Cover art 
The model in the photograph on the front cover is American actress and film producer Lisanne Falk.  The cover art was criticized by feminists for showing a teenage girl looking afraid in a boys' restroom.  But according to Foreigner lead singer Lou Gramm, the cover was intended to be cute, like a cartoon.  Gramm said "The girl is being naughty, erasing graffiti [in the restroom]. She's looking at whoever buys the album, she's been caught."  According to Miami Herald critic Bill Ashton, the cover art is a play on the album title Head Games.  Atlantic Records publicity director Stuart Ginsburg pointed out that "head is a naval term for bathroom" and Foreigner's media coordinator Susan Steinberg stated that "the girl on the cover is shocked by the graffiti. It's not like somebody is attacking her. I swear to you, it's not premeditated."

Release
In August 1979, the release of the album was preceded by its first single, the hard rock song "Dirty White Boy", which peaked at number 12 on the Billboard Hot 100 chart. The album itself continued Foreigner's popularity, climbing to number 5 on the Billboard 200 chart and receiving a Platinum certification four months after it hit the stores. By now, Head Games has gained a 5× Platinum status for selling at least 5 million copies in the United States. The next singles were the title track and "Women", which reached number 14 and 41, respectively.

Reception
Ultimate Classic Rock critic Eduardo Rivadavia rated three of the songs from Head Games – "Dirty White Boy," "Rev on the Red Line" and "I'll Get Even with You" – among  Foreigner's 10 most underrated songs.  Rivadavia praises Jones' "sizzling" guitar solo on "Rev on the Red Line," calling it one of the band's best b-sides.  

Classic Rock critic Malcolm Dome rated two songs from Head Games as being among Foreigner's 10 most underrated – "Rev on the Red Line" at #10 and "Dirty White Boy" at #3. Dome particularly praised the "sublime melody," Lou Gramm's vocal performance and the way all the musicians "show their skills, without ever showing off" on "Rev on the Red Line".  One the other hand, PopMatters critic Evan Sawdey called "Rev on the Red Line" "paint-by-numbers rock."

Billboard reviewer Gary Graff rated "Seventeen" to be Foreigner's ninth greatest song, calling it a "hidden gem."

Track listing

Personnel 
Foreigner
 Lou Gramm – lead vocals, percussion
 Mick Jones – lead guitar, backing vocals, acoustic piano; lead vocals (on "The Modern Day")
 Ian McDonald – keyboards, guitars, backing vocals
 Al Greenwood – keyboards
 Rick Wills – bass, backing vocals
 Dennis Elliott – drums

Production 
 Mick Jones – producer 
 Ian McDonald – producer 
 Roy Thomas Baker – producer
 Geoff Workman – engineer
 John Weaver – assistant engineer
 George Marino – mastering at Sterling Sound (New York, NY)
 Ted Jensen – 1995 digital remastering at Sterling Sound (New York)
 Dan Hersch – 2002 digital remastering
 Shawn R. Britton – 2013 MFSL mastering at Mobile Fidelity Sound Lab (Sebastopol, California)
 Sandi Young – art direction
 Chris Callis – front cover photo
 David Alexander – back cover photo
 William Coupon – booklet photos

Charts

Certifications

References

External links
The Official Foreigner Website

Foreigner (band) albums
1979 albums
Atlantic Records albums
Albums produced by Roy Thomas Baker
Albums produced by Mick Jones (Foreigner)
Albums produced by Ian McDonald (musician)